Mahmoud Shokry (also transliterated as Mahmoud Shoukry or Mahmoud Shukri), was a chief of staff of the Egyptian Army with the rank of Fariq (Lt. General). He was appointed by King Farouk after the signing of the Anglo-Egyptian Treaty of 1936 which led to the withdrawal of British forces from Egypt. He has a street in the heart of Cairo named after him.

References 

Egyptian soldiers
Living people
Year of birth missing (living people)